Love Bites is the second EP by the UK-based comedy band The Midnight Beast which was released on 14 February 2013.

Announcement and release
The song was first announced by the band on The Midnight Beast website on 1 February 2013.  Along with the announcement, it was also stated the EP would feature exclusive remixes by Hadouken! and Drums N’ Kicks (feat. Mr E Nigma). There was a link to the trailer for the song. The song was released on Valentine's Day of 2013 to continue with the theme (although used in dark humor) of love.

Video
On the same day the EP was released, the video for "Love Bites" (at 4 minutes and 32 seconds long) was uploaded to YouTube. The video features Abingdon talking about his new girlfriend (played by Kathryn Prescott)  who is a zombie. He then takes her on a double date with Wakely and his girlfriend, which ends with Wakely saying "Stef I think it's obvious your girlfriend here is gay". The girl then proceeds to attack Wakely and his girlfriend and bites Abingdon, who turns into a Zombie. The video ends with the words "To be continued", and a snippet of an unreleased song.

Track listing

Reference:

Notes
Track 3 and 4 are both remixes. One is by the band Hadouken!, who have toured with The Midnight Beast before. The second is done by Dru Wakely, under the name Drums n' Kicks

References

2013 EPs
The Midnight Beast albums